The 1995 Belarusian Premier League was the fifth season of top-tier football in Belarus. It started on 10 July and ended on 6 November 1995. Dinamo Minsk were the defending champions.

Team changes from 1994–95 season
Gomselmash Gomel and Lokomotiv Vitebsk, who finished on 15th and 16th places, relegated to Belarusian First League. They were replaced by two newcomers: First League 1994–95 winners MPKC Mozyr and runners-up Ataka-Aura Minsk.

Overview
The championship was played as a single round-robin tournament in the second half of 1995 due to change of the league schedule from winter to summer starting from 1996. This also was the first season with 3-point system. Dinamo Minsk won the championship for the 5th time in a row and qualified for the next season's UEFA Cup, as the Champions League was limited to 23 highest-ranked European national leagues which didn't include Belarus. The championship runners-up and 1995–96 Cup winners MPKC Mozyr qualified for the Cup Winners' Cup. The bronze medalists Dinamo-93 Minsk also qualified for UEFA Cup. Bobruisk, who finished in the last place, relegated and eventually dissolved immediately after the season.

Teams and venues

Table

Promotion/relegation play-off
Shinnik Bobruisk had to play two-legged play-off with First League runners-up Kommunalnik Pinsk. Shinnik won and both teams remained in their respective leagues.

Results

Belarusian clubs in European Cups

Top scorers

See also
1995 Belarusian First League
1995–96 Belarusian Cup

External links
RSSSF

Belarusian Premier League seasons
1
Belarus
Belarus